Elections to Preston Borough Council were held on 6 May 1999.  One third of the council was up for election and the Labour party kept overall control of the council after a Liberal Democrat councillor defected to them on the night of the counting of the votes.

After the election, the composition of the council was:

Election result

Ward results

The 1999 and 2000 results are for the electoral wards prior to the boundary changes which took place for the 2002 "all out" elections.

Ashton

This north west suburban ward was barely changed in the subsequent boundary changes put in place for 2002. This mix of housing and shopping areas includes a couple of popular schools and commuting bases.

Avenham

This troubled of high-rise flats and council housing, and private houses in the Frenchwood area on the banks of the River Ribble, would be merged with some areas of Preston's then town centre in the subsequent boundary review.

Brookfield

A ward in the north east of the town with a mix of social housing and a suburban outer core.

Cadley

Placed on the outer fringes of Fulwood this is a box-shaped urban ward of middle-class and retired population with a sizable commuting base.

Central

Based on the area surrounding the growing University and St Walberg's Church, this ward would be divided amongst a number of wards in the boundary review in place for the 2002 elections.

Deepdale

This ward of terraced housing and Preston North End football club was once recorded as the most deprived in the country.

Fishwick

The social housing estate of Callon and great swathes of comfortable housing makes up the Fishwick ward in the southwest of the town, up against the South Ribble border.

Greyfriars

In the north of the town, this ward named after a private house is a central element of Fulwood and spans the A6 road from Preston to Lancaster.

Ingol

In the north west of the town, the Ingol and Tanterton areas bring together a notable number of retirement homes and comfortable properties up against the Lancaster Canal and social housing.

Larches

Based on two post-war overspill estates of Larches and Savick

Moor Park

In the central area of Preston this ward is based on Plungington and the terraces near Moor Park itself. The ward cut into the southern parts of Fulwood which would be transferred in the subsequent boundary review to the new College ward.

Preston Rural East

This expanse of rural villages and farming communities includes the Broughton and Goosnargh.

Preston Rural West

Largely based on the Woodplumpton and Lea and Cottam areas to the west of the town towards the Fylde border.

Ribbleton

In the east of the town this ward has a high percentage of social housing.

Riversway

A growing ward with Broadgate against the River Ribble and the redeveloped Marina complex.

Sharoe Green

Based on the urban environs around the Sharoe Green hospital in the southern part of Fulwood

Sherwood

In the east of the town, against the rural border of Ribble Valley this ward of semi-rural housing and out-of-town industrial development was split in the subsequent boundary review.

St Matthews

The built up terraces and urban sprawl between the centre and the eastern extremities of Ribbleton. HMP Preston is in this ward.

Tulketh

A ward in the central west of the town crossing the main east/west Blackpool road.

References
1999 Preston election result

1999 English local elections
1999
1990s in Lancashire